Shweinbin Monastery is a Buddhist monastery in Mandalay, Burma, built in the tradition of Burmese teak architecture. The monastery was built in 1895 by a Sino-Burmese merchant married to a Burmese woman of royal extraction. The monastery's construction strictly adheres to traditional rules of Burmese monastic architecture and includes all of the designated pyatthat-crowned pavilions.

See also
Atumashi Monastery
Myadaung Monastery
Salin Monastery
Shwenandaw Monastery
Taiktaw Monastery

References

Monasteries in Myanmar
Buddhist temples in Mandalay
19th-century Buddhist temples
Religious buildings and structures completed in 1895